Partnership for Advancing Technology in Housing (PATH) is a "public/private sector initiative." The United States Department of Housing and Urban Development is responsible for its management. Its activities are coordinated by HUD's Office of Policy Development and Research (PD&R). PATH's goals are to improve "the development, dissemination, and use of new housing technologies."

PATH developed during the Clinton Administration:

 the White House convened representatives from all segments of America's construction industry to consider a broad set of National Construction Goals. Over the next three years, the residential segment of the construction industry, represented by homebuilders, code officials, product manufacturers, and other interested parties, developed a research plan for implementing National Construction Goals for the housing sector. PATH is the outgrowth of those proposals [...] PATH was officially launched on May 4, 1998.

HUD lists the goals of PATH as seeking to:
expand the development and utilization of new technologies in order to make American homes stronger, safer and more durable; more energy efficient and environmentally friendly; easier to maintain and less costly to operate; and more comfortable and exciting to live in.

See also
Playa Vista, Los Angeles, California

Notes

External links

PATH Announcement on Clinton Administration White House Website

Real estate in the United States
United States Department of Housing and Urban Development agencies